Liolaemus pseudoanomalus is a species of lizard in the family Iguanidae.  It is found in Argentina.

References

pseudoanomalus
Lizards of South America
Reptiles of Argentina
Endemic fauna of Argentina
Reptiles described in 1981
Taxa named by José Miguel Alfredo María Cei